Dwight Yoakam is an American country music singer-songwriter. Since his debut in 1984, Yoakam has released 17 studio albums. His debut album, Guitars, Cadillacs, Etc., Etc., was certified double-platinum by the Recording Industry Association of America, while This Time is certified triple-platinum by the same organization. Yoakam achieved the greatest success of his career in the 1980s and 1990s, however, in the 2000s, he left Reprise Records/Warner Bros. Nashville for an independent record label Audium/Koch Records in 2003 and released Population Me. In 2005, he released Blame the Vain on New West Records. The album was a commercial success on the charts, however, no singles that were released cracked the Top 40 of the Hot Country Songs chart.

In addition to releasing his studio albums, Yoakam has also released numerous compilation albums on various record labels, with a vast majority of them reaching success on the charts. His 1989 album Just Lookin' for a Hit is his best-selling compilation album.

Studio albums

1980s

1990s

2000s

2010s

Compilation albums

Live albums

Extended plays

Notes
A^ Guitars, Cadillacs, Etc., Etc. was re-issued in 2006 with extra bonus demo and live tracks. 
B^ Tomorrow's Sounds Today also peaked at number 28 on the Canadian RPM Country Albums chart.

References

Country music discographies
 
Discographies of American artists